N'Diaye is the Senegalese variant of the name Njie. N'Diaye may refer to:

 Alassane N'Diaye (born 1990), French-Senegalese football player
 Albert Abdoulaye N'Diaye
 Alfred N'Diaye (born 1990), French-Senegalese football player
 Amath Ndiaye Diedhiou (born 1996), Senegalese football player
 Assane N'Diaye (1974–2008), Senegalese football player
 Cheick N'Diaye (born 1985), Senegalese football player
 Doudou N'Diaye Rose (born 1928), Senegalese drummer
 Elhadjy Madior N'Diaye (born 1983), Senegalese football player
 Hamady N'Diaye (born 1987), Senegalese basketball player
 Iba N'Diaye (born 1928), French-Senegalese painter
 Leyti N'Diaye (born 1985), Senegalese footballer
 Maimouna N'Diaye, Senegalese actress and comedian
 Makhtar N'Diaye (born 1981), Senegalese football player
 Makhtar N'Diaye (basketball) (born 1973), Senegalese basketball player
 Mamadou N'Diaye (born 1975), Senegalese professional basketball player
 Mamadou N'Diaye (born 1984), Senegalese footballer
 Mamadou N'Diaye (born 1993), Senegalese professional basketball player
 Mame N'Diaye (born 1986), Senegalese footballer
 Mohamed N'Diaye (born 1997), Guinean footballer
 Mouhamed N'Diaye (born 1996), Senegalese footballer
 Momar N'Diaye (born 1987), Senegalese football striker
 Moussa N'Diaye (disambiguation)
 Nicolas Ambroise N'Diaye
 Pepe N'Diaye (born 1975), Senegalese football player
 Papa Waigo N'Diaye (born 1984), Senegalese football player
 Sylvain N'Diaye (born 1976), French-born Senegalese footballer
 Tenema N'Diaye (born 1981), Malian football player

See also
 Ndiaye (disambiguation)
 Ndoye (disambiguation)

Serer surnames